Brighton i360 is a  moving observation tower on the seafront of Brighton, East Sussex, England at the landward end of the remains of the West Pier. The tower opened on 4 August 2016. From the fully enclosed viewing pod, visitors experience 360-degree views across Brighton, the South Downs and the English Channel.

Brighton i360 was designed, engineered, manufactured and promoted by the team responsible for the London Eye. The attraction cost £46 million, with £36 million being funded by a Public Works Loan Board (PWLB) loan through Brighton and Hove city council.

Formerly known as the "British Airways i360", the project originally aimed to attract 739,000 paying customers every year. The owner of the site, the West Pier Trust, hoped in 2014 that a successful i360 would lead to the rebuilding of the historic West Pier. Visitor numbers never reached those projected and, in December 2022, the i360 defaulted on the debt it owed the council.

Design

Brighton i360 was designed by the architectural company Marks Barfield, which also designed the London Eye. The building was conceived as a "vertical pier".  The tower is located at the shore end of the ruined West Pier, and the design recreated the original Italianate ticket booths of the West Pier, placed on either side of the entrance, serving as ticket office and tea room.  The design also includes a beachfront building that allows access to the tower and houses a brasserie, café and gift shop.

The tower's initial design had included a wind turbine at the top and rainwater harvesting facilities, to help mitigate the attraction's environmental impact. In October 2015 the developers dropped both these proposals, claiming that the turbine would have stopped the tower's damping system from working and be susceptible to wind damage, and that the water would be "too dirty to be useable".

Construction

Plans were submitted in June 2006 and were approved by Brighton and Hove City Council later that year with construction projected to start in 2007. Following delays of around 15 months, the off-site construction of the sections of the tower began in 2008 in the Netherlands, and work on reconstructing the arches beneath and to the east of the pier to allow the tower construction began in November 2012. Work on the tower itself began in May 2014, with the attraction being scheduled to open in 2016.

The Dutch steelwork specialist Hollandia prefabricated the cylindrical steel sections of the tower, known by the team as cans.

The glass passenger pod was designed and built by cable car specialists Poma, which also built the London Eye capsules. The viewing pod travels from street level to a height of  before returning to beach level. The pod provides a 360-degree view through curved glass and is heated and air-conditioned, with full wheelchair accessibility and bench seating. It also contains a bar and restaurant in the base building.

English Heritage felt that the 2006 plan would "provide an outstanding feature on the seafront, and a worthy companion to any successor to the West Pier". In a statement, the West Pier Trust hoped that the project would "regenerate a key blighted city site and send out a loud message that Brighton is open for business".

The project was the winner of the Judges' Special Award at the British Construction Industry Awards 2017. It also won The Award for Tall or Slender Structures and The Supreme Award for Structural Engineering Excellence at The Institution of Structural Engineers' Structural Awards 2017.

Finance
The project was initially intended to be entirely privately funded. The architect, Marks Barfield, sold its stake in the London Eye and found financial backers to build the tower. Following the financial crisis of 2007–08, Marks Barfield approached Brighton and Hove Council for a loan. The council initially agreed to support the build with a £14.8 million loan, but this was raised after an unnamed private equity investor told the architects it could no longer proceed and withdrew its planned £15 million contribution in 2012. In March 2014, the project was expected to cost £46 million, with Brighton and Hove Council lending £36.2 million from the Public Works Loan Board and architects Marks Barfield contributing £6 million. The deal included Marks Barfield paying £1m annual profit to the council.

The case for the i360 was based on unrealistic projections of visitor numbers, figures the council kept secret, even fighting in the courts to prevent them being revealed. Council officials argued that "release of the full, un-redacted business case would prejudice the commercial interests of the i360 and the council." The figures were accidentally revealed to The Argus in October 2022, when the paper revealed that "the Brighton i360's revenues could be roughly half of what politicians were told they would be before they granted the taxpayer-backed loan, the business case today reveals." The figures suggested that there would be 822,584 visitors in the first year of operation, with more than 700,000 visitors in following years.

The £36.2 million loan was agreed at a Special Policy & Resources Committee in March 2014, the council agreeing to more than replace the lost investment capital and to again borrow from the Public Works Loan Board to effect the new bailout. The Coast to Capital local enterprise partnership (LEP) loan of £3 million was raised to £4 million. The West Pier Trust has suggested the project "will cost the taxpayer nothing", but some residents expressed concerns that any repayment risk would be borne by the residents of Brighton & Hove. The council has said that if the loan were not repaid, it would have the option to take over the attraction, find another operator or sell it.

In June 2018, disappointing visitor numbers forced the owners to ask Brighton and Hove City Council and the LEP for better loan repayment terms. Brighton and Hove News reported that "in the first full year, from August 2016, the i360 had just over 500,000 visitors, significantly fewer than the 800,000 predicted." The shortfall in visitors was "blamed on poor weather and the unreliable train service to and from London."

As of July 2022, the tower has been reported to owe more than £47 million. Between July and December 2022, the loan accrued interest of more than £323,000. Brighton and Hove City Council is currently carrying out "cash sweeps", where they will take any spare cash from the tower. The first of these occurred in June 2022, where the council took £700,000 to go towards the debts. Repayments are set to increase and continue until 2046. In December 2022, the i360 was unable to make the required second payment. In February 2023, the Council was forced to set aside £2.2 million a year from its budget to cover future missed repayments.

At a council meeting in Hove Town Hall on 27 February 2023, the Green leader of the council, Phélim Mac Cafferty, said: "“Only a few days ago, we had to set the budget. It has been absolutely horrendous. What we would also need to hear is some contrition, some reflection that this is adding to the burden on the city...The rest of us can look up and down the coast and see places like Shelter Hall doing really well. What has been missing from the board that means you haven’t been able to do that?””

Opening and operation

Brighton i360 opened on 4 August 2016.  A scheduled fireworks display was delayed for a week due to a storm off the coast. The operator's website states that "flights" depart every 30 minutes, with rides lasting approximately 25 minutes.

The pod was vandalised within the first few weeks of operation, with a foot-long crack in the glass being repaired after it was noticed by customers. A spokeswoman described the damage as "aesthetic" that held no risk to customers' safety.

The i360 experienced operational issues a month after opening. On two occasions in September 2016 the i360's pod became stuck. Just days later 200 visitors were trapped at ground level for over an hour. The tower was closed for a day for checks. A broken cable in February 2017 caused passengers to become stuck part way through the ride for two hours, and the i360 was closed over the weekend for repairs. In March 2017, the tower was closed due to a temporary fault; the third time the attraction has been closed since it opened.

In January 2022, it was announced that British Airways would end its sponsorship of the tower when naming rights expire on 3 November 2022. In October 2022, it was announced that the tower wouldn't have a sponsor and that from 1 November 2022 would instead just be called the "Brighton i360". The rebrand included new livery, a new lighting scheme for the tower and pod, the logo changing to a pink and white design which features a graphic of the tower and new signage for the attraction.

Opposition

The project was opposed on financial grounds by the Labour group on the council, who described it as "Green/Tory vanity project with 100% public funding when private sector partners could not be found....It was a flawed business model from the outset – as we tried to convince our Green and Conservative colleagues of at the time."

Many Brighton and Hove residents saw the i360 as "a disfiguration of the splendid Georgian environs, dubbing it the “i-sore”.". Rosemary Behan, in The Times, wrote "That such a monumental eyesore has been given planning permission is almost beyond belief. Some 150ft taller than the London Eye, this thick steel pole, with its doughnut-shaped pod, will dominate everything in sight." 
Writing in The Independent on the day following the launch, Janet Street-Porter described it as "a piss-poor replacement for Brighton’s West Pier."

During the planning and construction of the tower, a number of local residents and groups campaigned against the building of the tower and the public loan, with a petition gaining 1,449 signatures, including those of architects Paul Zara, of Conran & Partners, and Paul Nicholson, of Chalk Architecture; Simon Fanshawe, the writer and broadcaster, and Malcolm Dawes, chairman of the Brighton Society. Zara later become a supporter of the i360, declaring, "We should embrace it."

World's tallest moving observation tower claim
During promotions at the time of the tower's opening, its owners claimed that the i360 was "the world's tallest moving observation tower". The Guinness World Record title was later revoked after Guinness discovered that the  Top o'Texas Tower, which opened in 2013, had a moving platform which reached a greater height. The Advertising Standards Authority subsequently ordered British Airways to cease advertising the i360 in this way.

Other uses
In September 2021, car manufacturer Caterham Cars used the i360 as a car dealership showroom to mark the launch of the company's entry-level Seven 170, its lightest ever production car.

The Seven 170 was displayed alongside other Caterham models in the i360's operation deck. At 137 metres (450 feet) in the air, this temporarily created the world's highest car showroom.

In October 2022, Sam Ryder filmed the music video for his song Somebody whilst on top of the roof of the tower's pod.

In November 2022, violinist Esther Abrami released a music video of Walking in the Air composed and arranged by Howard Blake for violin and piano, featuring a nighttime performance from the roof of the tower.

Gallery

References

External links

Buildings and structures in Brighton and Hove
Tourist attractions in Brighton and Hove
Observation towers in the United Kingdom
Towers completed in 2016
2016 establishments in England